Pinnes or Pinnetes was a Pannonian chieftain, who led a rebellion alongside Breucian chieftain Bato (part of the wider bellum Batonianum) until Bato betrayed him and handed him over to the Romans, thus securing the rule over the Breuci.

See also 
 Illyrian warfare
 List of rulers of Illyria

References

External links

1st-century rulers in Europe
1st-century deaths
Year of birth unknown